In local government in the United States, sole commissioner government is a county commission with only one seat.  The sole commissioner typically holds all legislative and executive powers in the county.  Even though with one commissioner there is no voiced debate among the commission, sole commissioners typically hold public meetings to allow public input on decisions.

Though the structure was historically more widespread, now Georgia is the only state in the United States to have counties governed by a sole commissioner.  Debates over the establishment or removal of a sole commissioner government generally hinge on efficiency versus representation and debate.

Most counties with sole commissioners are small and rural. However, Bartow County, Georgia (part of exurban metro Atlanta) and, until recently, Walker County, Georgia (part of metro Chattanooga) are notable exceptions.

Counties with sole commissioners

Currently in Georgia
 Bartow
 Bleckley
 Chattooga
 Murray
 Pulaski
 Towns
 Union

Previously in Georgia

 Dade
 Pickens
Webster
Whitfield
 Walker (until 2021)

References 

Local government in the United States
Forms of local government
County executives in the United States
County commissioners in Georgia (U.S. state)